The 1994 Maui Invitational Tournament was an early-season college basketball tournament that was played, for the 11th time, from November 21 to November 23, 1994. The tournament, which began in 1984, was part of the 1994-95 NCAA Division I men's basketball season.  The tournament was played at the Lahaina Civic Center in Maui, Hawaii and was won by the Arizona State Sun Devils. It was the first title for the program and the third title for its head coach Bill Frieder.

Bracket

References

Maui Invitational Tournament
Maui Invitational